Manchester and Salford Police was a police force in England from 1 June 1968 to 31 March 1974. It was created as a merger of the Manchester City Police and Salford City Police and covered the adjacent county boroughs of Manchester and Salford.  It was amalgamated with parts of the Lancashire Constabulary and Cheshire Constabulary under the Local Government Act 1972 to form Greater Manchester Police.

See also
 Law enforcement in the United Kingdom
 List of law enforcement agencies in the United Kingdom, Crown Dependencies and British Overseas Territories
 Greater Manchester Fire and Rescue Service
 Life on Mars, a television drama depicting a Manchester police station in 1973

Defunct police forces of England
History of Salford
History of Manchester